Sidewalks of New York may refer to:
 Sidewalks of New York (1923 film), a 1923 silent film directed by Lester Park
 Sidewalks of New York (1931 film), a 1931 film starring Buster Keaton
 Sidewalks of New York (2001 film), a 2001 film written and directed by Edward Burns
 "The Sidewalks of New York", an 1894 popular song about life in New York City
 The Sidewalks of New York (cartoon), two short cartoons using the song, one released in 1925 and a re-release in 1929